John Nelson Howard (February 27, 1921 – April 15, 2015) was president of the Optical Society of America in 1991. He was the founding editor of the scientific journal Applied Optics.  Howard was also a chief scientist of the Air Force Geophysics Laboratory.

He was a Fellow of the Optical Society and received the OSA Distinguished Service Award in 1987.

In his later years he was a contributing editor to Optics and Photonics News (OPN).

See also
Optical Society of America#Past Presidents of the OSA

References

External links
 Articles Published by early OSA Presidents  Journal of the Optical Society of America

External links
 Tribute at OSA

1921 births
2015 deaths
Optical physicists
Spectroscopists
Fellows of Optica (society)
Presidents of Optica (society)
American physicists
Fellows of the American Physical Society